The Grand Lodge of Ancient, Free and Accepted Masons of Virginia, commonly known as "Grand Lodge of Virginia",  claims to be the oldest independent masonic grand lodge in the United States with 34,000 members in over 300 lodges.  Both the Grand Lodge of Pennsylvania and the Grand Lodge of Massachusetts dispute this claim, each claiming to be the oldest Grand Lodge in the United States. The Grand Lodge of Virginia was constituted on 30 October 1778, with headquarters in Williamsburg, Virginia. The grand lodge relocated its offices to Richmond, Virginia, in 1784, where it remains to this day.

History
The plans for its creation took root in a convention held on May 6, 1777.  The grand lodge was formally constituted on October 30, 1778, with its headquarters in Williamsburg, Virginia by the union of nine chartered lodges: Norfolk, at Norfolk; Port Royal in Caroline County; Blandford at Petersburg; Fredericksburg at Fredericksburg; Saint Tammany at Hampton; Williamsburg at Williamsburg; Botetourt at Gloucester Courthouse; Cabin Point in Prince George County and Yorktown at Yorktown.  Three other lodges in the colonial era chose not to participate.

George Washington was invited to be the first Grand Master, but was unable to accept the honor due to his military duties in the war for American independence, and because he had never been installed as master or warden of a lodge, he did not consider it masonically legal to serve as Grand Master.

In 1865 the Grand Lodge of West Virginia was formed taking a number of Lodges that had been part of the Grand Lodge of Virginia but that were now part of the state of West Virginia that had seceded from Virginia at the start of the American Civil War.  The Grand Lodge of West Virginia was founded in Fairmont in April 1865 with William Bates as its first Grand Master.  Over the following period there was confusion as many West Virginia lodges still maintained loyalty to the Grand Lodge of Virginia although all the West Virginia Lodges that were originally chartered by Virginia were re-chartered by the Grand Lodge of West Virginia within the next fifty years.

Grand Masters
The following men have been Grand Masters.

1778-84: John Blair Jr.
1785-86: James Mercer
1790: Alexander Montgomery
1791-93: Thomas Matthews
1794-95: John Marshall
1796-97: Robert Brooke
1798-1800: Benjamin Day
1801: William Austin
1802-03: Alexander McRae
1804-05: James Byrne
1806-07: William W. Hening
1807-08: David Robertson
1809: John H. Foushee
1810-12: Solomon Jacobs
1813-15: Robert Brough
1816-17: Charles H. Graves
1818-19: Archibald Magill
1820-21: John H. Purdie
1822: Samuel Jones
1823-24: Charles Yancey
1825-26: Mordecai Cooke
1826-27: David W. Patteson
1828-29: Robert G. Scott
1830-31: George C. Dromgoole
1832-33: William H. Fitzwhylsonn
1834-35: William Mitchell Jr.
1836-38: Levi L. Stevenson
1839-40: William A. Patteson
1841-42: Oscar Minor Crutchfield
1843-44: J. Worthington Smith
1845-46: John Robinson Purdie
1847-48: Sidney S. Baxter
1849-50: James Points
1851-52: James Evans
1853-54: Edmund P. Hunter
1855-56: James A. Leitch
1857-58: John S. Caldwell
1859: Powhatan B. Stark
1860-61: John Robin McDaniel
1862-63: Lewis Burwell Williams
1864-65: William H. Harman
1866-67: Edward H. Lane
1868-69: William Terry
1870-71: Thomas Flint Owens
1872-73: Robert Enock Withers
1874: William Henry Lambert
1875-76: William B. Taliaferror
1877: Richard Parker
1878-79: Beverley R. Wellford
1880-81: Peyton Skipwith Coles
1882-83: Reuben Murrell Page
1884: Henry William Murray
1885-86: Francis Henry Hill
1887-88: William F. Drinkard
1889-90: Robert T. Craighill
1891: John Howard Wayt
1892-93: William Henry Pleasants
1894: Mann Page
1895-96: John P. Fitzgerald
1897: Alfred Ransom Courtney
1898-99: Richard T. W. Duke Jr.
1900: George W. Wright
1901-02: Hiram Oscar Kerns
1903: Edward N. Eubank
1904-05: Thomas Newman Davis
1906: Kosciusko Kemper
1907: Silvanus Jackson Quinn
1908-09: Johseph W. Eggleston
1910-11: William B. McChesney
1912-13: William Luther Andrews
1914: Philip Kuszner Bauman
1915: James Burnley Wood
1916: James Alston Cabell
1917: Henry Knox Field
1918: Earnest Lee Cunningham
1919: Solomon Cuthins
1920: William Wilson Galt
1921: John Strother Bottimore
1922-23: James Hubert Price
1924-25: Charles Hilliard Callahan
1926: Benjamin William Beach
1927: James Bowman
1928: William Lee Davis
1929: John Twohig Cochran
1930: Frank Talbot McFaden
1931: Alexander M. Showalter
1932: Harry Kennedy Green
1933: James Clark Padgett
1934: William Moseley Brown
1935: Thomas W. Hooper
1936: Lynwood Polk Harrell
1937: Charles Vernon Eddy
1938: James Noah Hillman
1939: Needham S. Turnbull Jr.
1940: Thomas Jay Taylor
1941: Clarence D. Freeman
1942: Robert South Barrett
1943: William Robert Weisiger
1944: John Malcolm Stewart
1945: Earl C. Laningham
1946: Thomas Penn Coleman
1947: Harold R. Stephenson
1948: Charles Edward Webber
1949: Alfred Douglas Smith Jr.
1950: Enoch Dorron Flowers

See also
List of notable Masonic buildings in Virginia

References

External links 
 The Grand Lodge of Virginia Ancient, Free and Accepted Masons - Official Homepage

Virginia
Freemasonry in the United States
Organizations based in Virginia
1778 establishments in Virginia